Rudolf Davydovich Furmanov (22 October 1938 – 9 April 2021) was a Russian actor and stage director. He was born in Leningrad, Soviet Union on 22 October 1938, the son of a worker at the Goznak factory.

Biography 
Furmanov's career began in 1948, eventually appearing in more than 80 film roles, and further appearances in television. Among them was Artyom in The Circus Burned Down, and the Clowns Have Gone (1998) and as Igor in I Want to Go to Prison (1998).

Furmanov died on 9 April 2021 in Saint Petersburg, Russia at the age of 82 from COVID-19. Governor of Saint Petersburg Alexander Beglov was among those offering tributes, stating that "Saint Petersburg culture has suffered a heavy loss."

References

1938 births
2021 deaths
Russian film actors
Russian stage actors
Russian television actors
Theatre directors from Saint Petersburg
Male actors from Saint Petersburg
Recipients of the Order "For Merit to the Fatherland", 3rd class
Recipients of the Order "For Merit to the Fatherland", 4th class
People's Artists of Russia
Russian theatre managers and producers
Russian drama teachers
Deaths from the COVID-19 pandemic in Russia